Argyrotaenia onorei is a species of moth of the family Tortricidae. It is found in Ecuador in the provinces of Napo, Zamora-Chinchipe and Morona-Santiago.

The ground colour is pale brownish or greyish white with dark brown markings.

References

Moths described in 2004
onorei
Moths of South America